Charles Krause was an American gymnast and Olympic medalist. He competed at the 1904 Summer Olympics in St. Louis where he received a silver medal in rope climbin, and a bronze medal in team combined exercises.

References

American male artistic gymnasts
Gymnasts at the 1904 Summer Olympics
Olympic silver medalists for the United States in gymnastics
Year of birth unknown
Year of death unknown
Olympic bronze medalists for the United States in gymnastics
Medalists at the 1904 Summer Olympics
20th-century American people